Guia Maria Tagliapietra (born 11 August 1998) is an Italian figure skater. She has won three senior international medals and the 2014 Italian national junior title. She placed 15th at the 2015 World Junior Championships in Tallinn, Estonia.

Programs

Competitive highlights 
CS: Challenger Series; JGP: Junior Grand Prix

References

External links 
 

1998 births
Italian female single skaters
Living people
People from Aosta
Sportspeople from Aosta Valley
20th-century Italian women
21st-century Italian women